Rosie King (born  1998) is a British writer, public speaker and autism advocate. She has featured in a BBC documentary on the subject, and she is a prominent contributor to the Pablo TV series.

Biography
King diagnosed herself with autism at the age of 10 after reading about it in the book Little Rainman: Autism - Through the Eyes of a Child which her parents had obtained to explain her brother's diagnosis. She was officially diagnosed with Asperger syndrome after a year-long process.

Her mother, Sharon King, published a fairy tale that featured an autistic character in 2010 and King contributed drawings to illustrate pixies, fairies and goblins. This led to her being featured in the 2011 BBC Newsround documentary My Autism and Me. This short film went on to win an International Emmy and a Royal Television Society Award. She herself was awarded the Yorkshire Children of Courage award after her appearance in this documentary.

At the 2014 edition of the TEDMED Conference she was invited to speak about her autism diagnosis. She spoke about how she sees her autism as an asset rather than something holding her back and how it is backward to place normality on a pedestal.

In 2017, she was cast and contributes to the writing of the CBeebies animated TV show Pablo, which focuses on an autistic boy, for which she also voiced the character Llama, who displays many of the traits of autism, such as echolalia.

References

External links
  Rosie King: How autism freed me to be myself 2014 TED talk
 

1990s births
Living people
People with Asperger syndrome
Autism activists
British activists
British television writers
British voice actresses
British women television writers